Kayla Rose Williams (born May 8, 1993) is an American artistic gymnast. She is the 2009 vault world champion and 2009 vault national champion.

Senior career
Williams began 2009 as a Level 10 gymnast, which is below elite level in USA Gymnastics. In May 2009, she won the Junior Olympic National Championships in the all-around, vault, and floor exercise and won second on balance beam. She qualified to elite level at a meet in June.

After qualifying for the U.S. Classic, she won the vault and floor exercise at that event and placed fifth in the all-around and on balance beam. This qualified her to the 2009 USA Gymnastics National Championships. Williams was the first West Virginian since Mary Lou Retton in 1984 to compete at the U.S. Championships. At the U.S. Championships,  she won the National title on vault and made the U.S. National Team as a senior elite. Two months later, Williams was named to the team for the 2009 World Artistic Gymnastics Championships.

At the 2009 World Championships, Williams qualified first on vault. On the night of the vault event final, she competed a handspring laidout Rudi and a Yurchenko double full for a combined score of 15.087 and won the gold medal. She is the first American gymnast to win the World vault title.

Collegiate career
She retired from elite gymnastics in July 2010, but competes in Level 10 and in the NCAA. In May 2010, she committed to compete for the University of Alabama gymnastics team.

As a freshman in 2012, Williams helped lead Alabama to their second consecutive National Championship. As a senior in 2015, she won bronze on the vault at the NCAA Championships.

Personal life
Williams attended Huntington High School.

She graduated at the University of Alabama with a bachelor's degree in public relations in August 2014. She is currently enrolled at Tulane Law School, and expected to graduate in 2023.

References
Bozho's Gym Nest 1999-2009

External links
 
 
 Alabama Crimson Tide bio

1993 births
Living people
Alabama Crimson Tide women's gymnasts
American female artistic gymnasts
Level 10 gymnasts
Medalists at the World Artistic Gymnastics Championships
People from Nitro, West Virginia
Sportspeople from Huntington, West Virginia
World champion gymnasts
U.S. women's national team gymnasts
Huntington High School (West Virginia) alumni